This is a list of notable alumni of St Ignatius' College located in Enfield, London, England.

Alumni
 David Brading Historian
 Peter Burke, historian
 Bernard Butler, musician
 Michael Coveney, theatre critic
 Peter Doyle, current Roman Catholic Bishop of Northampton
 Reginald Dunne, British-born WW1 soldier, later an Irish Republican Army volunteer hanged for the murder of Sir Henry Wilson
 Wojciech Giertych, Dominican theologian to the Papal Household
 Brian Hanrahan, BBC Diplomatic Editor
 John Carmel Cardinal Heenan, Head of the Roman Catholic Church in England and Wales 1965-75
 Sir Alfred Hitchcock, film director
 Brian Keaney, children's author
 Jo Kuffour, footballer
 Donal Logue, Canadian-born American actor, writer
 Dermi Lusala, footballer for Coventry City 
 Sir George Martin, signed The Beatles and greatly influenced their sound and success by producing many of their albums, including the 1967 Sgt Pepper's Lonely Hearts Club Band
 John Maybury, filmmaker
 Paul McKenna, hypnotist
 TJ Moncur, English footballer who plays for Cray Wanderers FC in the Isthmian League Premier Division
 Kenny Morris, drummer in Siouxsie and the Banshees
 Terence Patrick O'Sullivan, civil engineer
 Edmund Purdom, British actor and producer; star of the 1954 MGM film The Student Prince
 Sarbel (born Sarbel Michael), Greek Cypriot musician
 George Sewell, actor, Get Carter, Z-Cars, Canned Carrott
 Dave Sexton, Manchester United F.C. manager (1977–1981)
 Adrian Smith, guitarist with Iron Maiden
 Gerard Woodward, Booker-shortlisted novelist and poet
 Tarinn Callender, Actor (Hamilton)
 Regé-Jean Page, Actor (Brigerton)
 Kevin Hyland OBE, First Anti-Slavery Commissioner, police officer & army Royal Military Police

References

Saint Ignatius' College